William Packard may refer to:

William Alfred Packard (1830–1909), American classical scholar
William Doud Packard (1861–1923), American co-founder of Packard Motor Company
William Guthrie Packard (1889–1987), American law book publisher, owner of Shepard's Citations
William P. Packard (1838–?), American politician
William Packard (author) (1933–2002), American poet, playwright, teacher, novelist, and founder/editor of the New York Quarterly